The Color of Passion (Original title in Spanish: El color de la pasión) is a Mexican telenovela produced by Roberto Gómez Fernández for Televisa. The telenovela is written by Cuauhtémoc Blanco, who wrote the telenovelas Mi pecado, Cadenas de amargura, and El manantial.

The plot revolves around Rebeca (Michelle Renaud / Claudia Ramírez), a woman who always hated her sister Adriana (Ariadne Díaz) for having everything including the man whom Rebeca loved. Rebeca murders her sister to end up with the man and becomes the step mother/aunt of her sister's daughter Lucía. (Esmeralda Pimentel). Nora (Ximena Romo) (Lucia's half sister and daughter of Rebeca) resents Lucia for the same reasons Rebeca hated Adriana, as history repeats itself.

The series stars Erick Elias as Marcelo, Esmeralda Pimentel as Lucía, Claudia Ramírez as Rebeca, René Strickler as Alonso, Eugenia Cauduro as Magdalena and Ariadne Díaz as Adriana.

Plot summary

First stage 

Adriana Murillo de Gaxiola (Ariadne Díaz) is married to Alonso Gaxiola (Horacio Pancheri), owner of a Talavera factory in Puebla. Magdalena (Ana Isabel Torre) and Rebeca (Michelle Renaud), sisters of Adriana, live with her sister and husband due to them being orphans. Alonso and Adriana have a solid and happy marriage, but are unaware of Rebeca's true envious nature, which she masks by being a "sweet angel". This facade does not fool Magdalena, who suspects Rebeca's true nature.

Rebeca has always been secretly in love with Alonso, and therefore harbors envious feelings towards her sister; that feeling becomes hatred upon learning that Adriana will soon become a mother. Rebeca's wicked nature extends to her sister Magdalena, who was responsible that Magdalena was left at the altar. Because of this, Magdalena develops depression and is helpless in uncovering Rebeca's secret.

Soon, Adriana discovers all of Rebeca's secrets and kicks her out of their house. However, they get into an argument which ends with the balcony railing snapping and causing Adriana to fall from the second floor, hitting her head on the glass table below.

Tragically, Adriana loses her life, but miraculously her daughter survives and is named Lucía, after Adriana's mother.

Second stage 

It's been 24 years since the tragic accident. Rebeca (Claudia Ramírez) and Alonso (René Strickler) are married and are the parents of their daughter, Nora (Ximena Romo), an unbalanced, envious and selfish girl, who has always felt less than her sister and wants everything she has. In addition Rebeca, more than an aunt, has been a mother for Lucía (Esmeralda Pimentel), although secretly hates her as she considers Lucía to be the living proof of the great love that there once was between her sister Adriana and Alonso. This frustration leads Rebeca to have thousands of lovers, one of them is Féderico Valdivia Fuentes (Alfonso Dosal), a man much younger than her, and who is so obsessed with Rebeca so much that commits suicide in front of her when she breaks up with him.

Lucía is a young, noble and sweet girl of good feelings that is about to marry Rodrigo Zúñiga (Mariano Palacios), her boyfriend of most of her life. However, she finds out her sister, Nora, is sleeping with Rodrigo after he leaves Lucia planted in the altar. This causes Lucía to fall into a brief depression.

Féderico's brother, Marcelo Escalante Fuentes, (Erick Elías) arrives in Puebla to take revenge on the woman who lead to his brother's death, but is surprised to learn that the woman he seeks, Adriana Murillo, died 24 years ago. This leads him to delve into the Gaxiola-Murillo family and there he meets Lucía, who he falls in love with, not knowing she is the niece of Rebeca, the woman he seeks and for which his half-brother committed suicide, but things will not be so easy for Marcelo since Lucía does not want to know anything about love after the trauma she experienced on her wedding day.

He gets Lucía to fall in love with him and for reasons of destiny they are separated again but will fight to be together forever and overcome each obstacle (especially those imposed by Nora and Rebeca) to consolidate their love.

Cast

Main 
 Erick Elias as Marcelo Escalante 
 Esmeralda Pimentel as Lucía Gaxiola Murillo
 Claudia Ramírez as Rebeca Murillo de Gaxiola
 René Strickler as Alonso Gaxiola
 Eugenia Cauduro as Magdalena Murillo
 Ariadne Díaz as Adriana Murillo de Gaxiola

Secondary 
 Helena Rojo as Milagros Fuentes
 Arcelia Ramírez as Sara
 Ximena Romo as Nora Gaxiola Murillo
 Mariano Palacios as Rodrigo Zúñiga
 Moisés Arizmendi as Amador Zúñiga
 Montserrat Marañon as Brígida Zuñiga
 Pablo Valentín as Mario 
 Marcia Coutiño as Ligia
 Marcela Morett as Norma
 Andrés Almeida as Padre Samuel
 Natalia Guerrero as Daniela Suárez
 Eduardo España as Lalo
 Arturo Vázquez as Vinicio
 Gloria Izaguirre as Tere 
 Mauricio Abularach as Sergio
 Edsa Ramírez as Gloria
 Ilse Ikeda as Lety
 Maribel Lancioni as Lorena
 Patricia Reyes Spíndola as Trinidad 
 Luis Couturier as Nazario
 Angelina Peláez as Rafaela

Recurring 
 Luis Gatica as Ricardo Márquez
 Javier Jattin as Román Andrade
 Harold Azuara as Benito Rosales
 Roberto Blandón as Alfredo Suárez
 Erwin Veytia as Juárez
 Nuria Bages as Aída
 Luis Fernando Peña as Ruperto

Guest 
 Alfonso Dosal as Féderico Valdivia Fuentes
 Michelle Renaud as Young Rebeca Murillo
 Ana Isabel Torre as Young Magdalena Murillo
 Horacio Pancheri as Young Alonso Gaxiola
 Rodrigo Massa as Young Amador Zúñiga
 Fernanda Arozqueta as Young Brígida de Zúñiga
 Claudio Roca as Young Mario Hernández
 Ramón Valera as Young Ricardo Márquez
 Nuria Gil as Young Clara Rosales

Production 
The telenovela began its production in Puebla on February 4, 2014. For the beginning only the following actors were present: Erick Elías, Esmeralda Pimentel, Eduardo España, Ariadne Díaz, Eugenia Cauduro, René Strickler and Claudia Ramírez.

Development 
For the development of the telenovela producers decided to set the novel in a province of Mexico City, to show the entire world the beautiful landscapes and localities of Mexico, since Puebla is considered a small Mexican Hollywood.

Reception 
The telenovela premiered on March 17, 2014 replacing De que te quiero, te quiero.  During the premiere, The Color of Passion had recorded 15.5 rating points. On August 31, 2014, it surpassed 22.8 rating points in the final.
In the United States, it premiered on September 6, 2016 with 1.9 million viewers.

Episodes

Series Overview

Season 1 (2014)

Awards and nominations

References

External links 

Mexican telenovelas
2014 telenovelas
Televisa telenovelas
2014 Mexican television series debuts
Spanish-language telenovelas
2014 Mexican television series endings